Qarabaqqal (also, Karabakkal and Karasakhkal) is a village and municipality in the Goychay Rayon of Azerbaijan.  It has a population of 2,466.

References 

Populated places in Goychay District